This is a list of the 16 prefectures of the Central African Republic and the autonomous commune (capital city) of Bangui by Human Development Index as of 2023 with data for the year 2021.

See also 

 List of countries by Human Development Index

References 

Ranked lists of country subdivisions
Human Development Index
Human Development Index